Julius August Robert Wilke (November 14, 1860 – December 22, 1914) was an American sailor serving in the United States Navy during the Spanish–American War who received the Medal of Honor for bravery.

Biography
Wilke was born November 14, 1860, in Germany, and after entering the navy he was sent as a Boatswain's Mate First Class to fight in the Spanish–American War aboard the U.S.S. Marblehead. Wilke died on December 22, 1914, at the age of 54 years old.

Medal of Honor citation
Rank and organization: Boatswain's Mate First Class, U.S. Navy. Born: November 14, 1860, Germany. Accredited to: New York. G.O. No.: 521, July 7, 1899.

Citation:

On board the U.S.S. Marblehead during the operation of cutting the cable leading from Cienfuegos, Cuba, 11 May 11, 1898. Facing the heavy fire of the enemy, Wilke displayed extraordinary bravery and coolness throughout this action.

See also

List of Medal of Honor recipients for the Spanish–American War

References

External links

The Cutting of the Cables at Cienfuegos
Deeds of Valor

1860 births
1914 deaths
United States Navy Medal of Honor recipients
United States Navy sailors
German emigrants to the United States
American military personnel of the Spanish–American War
German-born Medal of Honor recipients
Spanish–American War recipients of the Medal of Honor